A voivodeship or voivodate is the area administered by a voivode (Governor) in several countries of central and eastern Europe. Voivodeships have existed since medieval times and the area of extent of voivodeship resembles that of a duchy in western medieval states, much as the title of voivode was equivalent to that of a duke. Other roughly equivalent titles and areas in medieval Eastern Europe included ban (bojan, vojin or bayan) and banate.

In a modern context, the word normally refers to one of the provinces (województwa) of Poland. , Poland has 16 voivodeships.

Terminology
A voi(e)vod(e) (literally, "leader of warriors" or "war leader", equivalent to the Latin "Dux Exercituum") was originally a military commander who stood, in a state's structure, next to the ruler. Later the word came to denote an administrative official.

Some of these words, or variants of them, may also be used in English.

Named for the word for "voivodeship" is the autonomous Serbian province of Vojvodina.

Though the word "voivodeship" (other spellings are "voievodship" and "voivodship") appears in English dictionaries such as the OED and Webster's, it is not in common general usage, and voivodeships in Poland and elsewhere are frequently referred to as "provinces". Depending on context, historic voivodeships may also be referred to as "duchies", "palatinates" (the Latin word "palatinatus" was used for a voivodeship in Poland), "administrative districts" or "regions".

Historical voivodeships

in Southeastern Europe

In the territory of modern Romania and Moldova, the regions of Wallachia, Moldavia and Transylvania were formerly voivodeships. The region of Maramureș, now split between Romania and Ukraine, also used to be its own voivodeship, the Voivodeship of Maramureș.

Historical voivodeships in the territory of modern Serbia include the Voivodeship of Salan (9th–10th centuries), Voivodeship of Sermon (11th century), and Voivodeship of Syrmia of Radoslav Čelnik (1527–1530). A voivodeship called Serbian Vojvodina was established in 1848–1849; this was transformed into the Voivodeship of Serbia and Temes Banat, a land within the Austro-Hungarian Empire from 1849 to 1860. This is the origin of the name of the present-day Serbian autonomous province of Vojvodina.

In Poland and Lithuania
For more information about the divisions of Polish lands in particular periods, see Administrative divisions of Poland ("Historical").

Voivodeships in the Polish–Lithuanian Commonwealth (1569–1795):
In the Polish Crown Lands:

Poznań Voivodeship
Kalisz Voivodeship
Gniezno Voivodeship
Sieradz Voivodeship
Łęczyca Voivodeship
Brześć Kujawski Voivodeship
Inowrocław Voivodeship
Chełmno Voivodeship
Malbork Voivodeship
Pomeranian Voivodeship
Płock Voivodeship
Rawa Voivodeship
Masovian Voivodeship
Kraków Voivodeship
Sandomierz Voivodeship
Lublin Voivodeship
Podlasie Voivodeship
Ruthenian Voivodeship
Bełz Voivodeship
Wolhynia Voivodeship
Podole Voivodeship
Bracław Voivodeship
Kijów Voivodeship
Czernihów Voivodeship

In the historical Grand Duchy of Lithuania:

 Vilnius Voivodeship
 Trakai Voivodeship
 Nowogródek Voivodeship
 Brest-Litovsk Voivodeship
 Minsk Voivodeship
 Mścisław Voivodeship
 Smolensk Voivodeship
 Vitebsk Voivodeship
 Połock Voivodeship

In the historical Duchy of Livonia:
 Wenden Voivodeship (1598–1620)
 Dorpat Voivodeship (1598–1620)
 Parnawa Voivodeship (1598–1620)
 Inflanty Voivodeship (from the 1620s)

Voivodeships of Poland, 1921–1939:
Silesian Voivodeship (Województwo Śląskie)
Białystok Voivodeship  (Województwo Białostockie)
Kielce Voivodeship (Województwo Kieleckie)
Kraków Voivodeship  (Województwo Krakowskie)
Łódź Voivodeship  (Województwo Łódzkie)
Lublin Voivodeship  (Województwo Lubelskie)
Lwów Voivodeship  (Województwo Lwowskie)
Nowogródek Voivodeship  (Województwo Nowogrodzkie)
Polesie Voivodeship  (Województwo Poleskie)
Pomeranian Voivodeship  (Województwo Pomorskie)
Poznań Voivodeship  (Województwo Poznańskie)
Stanisławów Voivodeship  (Województwo Stanisławowskie)
Tarnopol Voivodeship  (Województwo Tarnopolskie)
Warsaw Voivodeship  (Województwo Warszawskie)
Wilno Voivodeship  (Województwo Wileńskie)
Volhynian Voivodeship  (Województwo Wołyńskie)

Voivodeships of Poland, 1945–1975:

Białystok Voivodeship
Bydgoszcz Voivodeship
Gdańsk Voivodeship
Katowice Voivodeship
Kielce Voivodeship
Koszalin Voivodeship
Kraków Voivodeship
Łódź Voivodeship
Lublin Voivodeship
Olsztyn Voivodeship
Opole Voivodeship
Poznań Voivodeship
Rzeszów Voivodeship
Szczecin Voivodeship
Warsaw Voivodeship
Wrocław Voivodeship
Zielona Góra Voivodeship

Voivodeships of Poland, 1975–1998:

Biała Podlaska Voivodeship
Białystok Voivodeship
Bielsko-Biała Voivodeship
Bydgoszcz Voivodeship
Chełm Voivodeship
Ciechanów Voivodeship
Częstochowa Voivodeship
Elbląg Voivodeship
Gdańsk Voivodeship
Gorzów Voivodeship
Jelenia Góra Voivodeship
Kalisz Voivodeship
Katowice Voivodeship
Kielce Voivodeship
Konin Voivodeship
Koszalin Voivodeship
Kraków Voivodeship
Krosno Voivodeship
Legnica Voivodeship
Leszno Voivodeship
Łódź Voivodeship
Łomża Voivodeship
Lublin Voivodeship
Nowy Sacz Voivodeship
Olsztyn Voivodeship
Opole Voivodeship
Ostrołęka Voivodeship
Piotrków Voivodeship
Piła Voivodeship
Poznań Voivodeship
Przemyśl Voivodeship
Płock Voivodeship
Radom Voivodeship
Rzeszów Voivodeship
Siedlce Voivodeship
Sieradz Voivodeship
Skierniewice Voivodeship
Suwałki Voivodeship
Szczecin Voivodeship
Słupsk Voivodeship
Tarnobrzeg Voivodeship
Tarnów Voivodeship
Toruń Voivodeship
Warsaw Voivodeship
Wałbrzych Voivodeship
Wrocław Voivodeship
Włocławek Voivodeship
Zamość Voivodeship
Zielona Góra Voivodeship

References

Former subdivisions of Belarus
Geographic history of Hungary
Medieval Romania
Geographic history of Latvia
Geographic history of Ukraine
Geographic history of Moldova
Geography of Poland
Types of administrative division
Subdivisions of the Ottoman Empire